Piper is an unincorporated community in Calhoun County, Iowa, in the United States.

History
Piper was a station on the Fort Dodge, Des Moines & Southern Railroad.

References

Unincorporated communities in Calhoun County, Iowa
Unincorporated communities in Iowa